The British Columbia Mainland Cricket League (BCMCL) was founded in 1914 by seven founding member clubs. It is a competitive cricket league and is known for its scenic cricket grounds, most notably Stanley Park. According to the league's president, Inamul Desai, the BCMCL is the second-largest cricket league in North America.

Organization
In 2019, the league hosted 89 teams (including junior teams), which played 1100 games in the regular season, which lasts from the end of April to mid-September. The teams are organized into nine divisions. At the end of the season, playoffs against the top two teams in each division are held, in which teams compete to move up in the division. Teams that end the season at the bottom of their division are relegated to the lower level.

Teams
The current list of regular season teams, organized by division, as of 2017. A total of 29 cricket clubs representing local cities and organizations compete in the league. Many of these clubs field multiple teams, denoted by a Roman numeral suffix.

See also
 Canada national cricket team
 Cricket in Canada

References

Cricket
Canadian domestic cricket competitions